Attila Podolszki (born 9 October 1964) is a Hungarian wrestler. He competed in the men's freestyle 68 kg at the 1988 Summer Olympics.

References

1964 births
Living people
Hungarian male sport wrestlers
Olympic wrestlers of Hungary
Wrestlers at the 1988 Summer Olympics
Martial artists from Budapest